Nirra Fields (born December 3, 1993) is a Canadian professional basketball player for İzmit Belediyespor. She has also played for the Phoenix Mercury of the Women's National Basketball Association (WNBA). Fields represents the Canadian national team internationally, where she participated at the 2014 FIBA World Championship.

High school
Fields started high school at Lakeside Academy in Montreal in 2007, followed by Lower Canada College for a year. The following year she spent at Regina High School in South Euclid, Ohio. She spent her junior year at Oak Hill Academy in Virginia, where she averaged 26.5 points per game. She transferred to Mater Dei High School in Santa Ana, California for her senior year. Although she only played for Mater Dei for one year, she made enough of an impact that the school retired her jersey at the end of the year. During the year, she averaged just over 22 points a game to help the team to a 34–3 record and a CIF SS Division 1AA state championship. She was named a McDonald's All-American and eligible to play in the McDonald's All-American game, the first female Canadian to earn such an honour.

FIBA
Fields played for Canada in the 2010 FIBA Under-17 World Championship for Women held in Toulouse and Rodez, France from July 16–25, 2010. She averaged 22.4 points and 6.9 rebounds per game. She scored 30 points against France and 36 against Japan. The following year, she played for the Canadian team in the 2011 FIBA Under-19 World Championship for Women  held in Puerto Montt, Chile. She helped the team to a fifth-place finish with an 8–1 record. She averaged 15.9 points and 5.4 rebounds per game.

In 2014, she played for the senior women's national team at the 2014 FIBA World Championship for Women held in Ankara and Istanbul, Turkey, from September 27 to October 5, 2014. She helped the team to a fifth-place finish with an overall record of 4–3. She averaged 5.7 points and 2.6 rebounds per game.

Pam Am games 2015
Fields was a member of the Canada women's national basketball team, which participated in basketball at the 2015 Pan American Games held in Toronto, Ontario, Canada July 10 to 26, 2015. Canada opened the preliminary rounds with an easy 101–38 win over Venezuela. The following day they beat Argentina 73–58. The final preliminary game was against Cuba; both teams were 2–0, so the winner would win the group. The game went down to the wire, with Canada eking out a 71–68 win. Canada would face Brazil in the semifinal.

Everything seemed to go right in the semifinal game. Canada opened the game with an 11–2 run on seven consecutive points by Miranda Ayim. Miah-Marie Langlois contributed five assists. In the third quarter, Canada strongly outrebounded Brazil and hit 69% of their field goals to score 33 points in the quarter. Lizanne Murphy and Fields hit three-pointers to help extend the lead to 68–39 at the end of three quarters. Canada continued to dominate in the fourth quarter with three-pointers by Kia Nurse and Kim Gaucher. Canada went on to win the game 91–63 to earn a spot in the gold-medal game against the USA.

The gold-medal game matched the host team Canada against the USA in a sold-out arena dominated by fans in red and white and waving the Canadian flag. The Canadian team, arm in arm, sang Oh Canada as the respective national anthems were played.

After trading baskets early, the US edged out to a double-digit lead in the second quarter. However, the Canadians, spurred on by the home crowd cheering, fought back and tied up the game at halftime. It was Canada's time to shine in the third quarter as they outscored the US 26–15. The lead would reach as high as 18 points. The USA would fight back, but not all the way, and Canada won the game and the gold-medal 81–73. It was Canada's first gold medal in basketball in the Pan Am games. Nurse was the star for Canada with 33 points, hitting 11 of her 12 free-throw attempts in 10 of her 17 field-goal attempts, including two of three three-pointers. Fields contributed seven rebounds to lead the team and nine points.

UCLA statistics

References

External links

1993 births
Living people
Basketball people from British Columbia
Basketball players at the 2015 Pan American Games
Basketball players at the 2016 Summer Olympics
Basketball players at the 2020 Summer Olympics
Black Canadian basketball players
Canadian expatriate basketball people in the United States
Canadian expatriate basketball people in Hungary
Canadian expatriate basketball people in Poland
Canadian expatriate basketball people in Turkey
Canadian women's basketball players
Guards (basketball)
Olympic basketball players of Canada
Pan American Games gold medalists for Canada
Pan American Games medalists in basketball
Phoenix Mercury draft picks
Phoenix Mercury players
Basketball players from Vancouver
UCLA Bruins women's basketball players
Medalists at the 2015 Pan American Games